Gorges Lowther may refer to:

 Gorges Lowther (1769–1854), Irish Member of Parliament
 Gorges Lowther (1713–1792), Irish Member of Parliament

See also
 George Lowther (disambiguation)